Egg-beater (egg beater, eggbeater) may refer to:
A hand-cranked tool for beating eggs, as for omelettes or cake-baking: see Mixer (appliance) § Eggbeater 
Mixer (appliance), an electric kitchen appliance often referred to as an "egg-beater"
Egg Beaters, an egg white–based ingredient used in cooking or baking 
Eggbeater wind turbine
Eggbeater drill, a type of hand drill with bevel gears, analogous in form to an eggbeater for the kitchen: see Drill § Hand-powered 
Eggbeater kick, a swimming manoeuver
Eggbeater antenna
 Egg beater, a model of clipless pedals for bicycles